David Goode or Good may refer to:

David Goode (organist) (born 1971), British organist and head of keyboard at Eton College
David Goode (sculptor) (born 1966), British sculptor
David R. Goode (born 1941), retired chairman, president, and CEO of Norfolk Southern Corporation
David Good (driver) (1933 – 2017), British hillclimb driver
David Good (golfer) (born 1947), Australian golfer
David Good (author) (born 1942), son of Kenneth Good, anthropologist

See also
 Goode (surname)